José Antonio del Sagrado Corazón Haghenbeck Cámara (born 7 June 1955) is a Mexican surgeon, physician and politician affiliated with the National Action Party. As of 2014 he served as Senator of the LVIII and LIX Legislatures of the Mexican Congress representing Hidalgo.

References

1955 births
Living people
Politicians from Puebla
Mexican surgeons
Members of the Senate of the Republic (Mexico)
National Action Party (Mexico) politicians
21st-century Mexican politicians
People from Tehuacán